Red lacewing can refer to either of two butterfly species in the genus Cethosia:
Cethosia biblis, from South and Southeast Asia
Cethosia cydippe, from Australia, New Guinea and nearby islands

Animal common name disambiguation pages